Histopona is a genus of funnel weavers first described as a sub-genus of Hadites by Tamerlan Thorell in 1870. It was elevated to genus by Brignoli in 1972.

Species
 it contains twenty-two species:

Histopona bidens (Absolon & Kratochvíl, 1933) – Croatia, Macedonia
Histopona breviemboli Dimitrov, Deltshev & Lazarov, 2017 – Bulgaria, Turkey (Europe)
Histopona conveniens (Kulczyński, 1914) – Bosnia and Herzegovina
Histopona dubia (Absolon & Kratochvíl, 1933) – Croatia, Bosnia and Herzegovina
Histopona egonpretneri Deeleman-Reinhold, 1983 – Croatia
Histopona fioni Bolzern, Pantini & Isaia, 2013 – Switzerland, Italy
Histopona hauseri (Brignoli, 1972) – Greece, Macedonia
Histopona isolata Deeleman-Reinhold, 1983 – Greece (Crete)
Histopona italica Brignoli, 1977 – Italy
Histopona krivosijana (Kratochvíl, 1935) – Montenegro
Histopona kurkai Deltshev & Indzhov, 2018 – Albania, Macedonia
Histopona laeta (Kulczyński, 1897) – Balkans
Histopona leonardoi Bolzern, Pantini & Isaia, 2013 – Switzerland, Italy
Histopona luxurians (Kulczyński, 1897) – Austria to Ukraine and south-eastern Europe
Histopona myops (Simon, 1885) – South-eastern Europe
Histopona palaeolithica (Brignoli, 1971) – Italy, Montenegro
Histopona sinuata (Kulczyński, 1897) – Romania
Histopona strinatii (Brignoli, 1976) – Greece
Histopona thaleri Gasparo, 2005 – Greece
Histopona torpida (C. L. Koch, 1837) – Europe, Caucasus
Histopona tranteevi Deltshev, 1978 – Bulgaria
Histopona vignai Brignoli, 1980 – Albania, Macedonia, Greece

References

External links

 
Agelenidae
Araneomorphae genera
Taxa named by Tamerlan Thorell